Tetragonoderus assuanensis is a species of beetle in the family Carabidae. It was described by Mjuberg in 1905.

References

assuanensis
Beetles described in 1905